Thiago Magalhães Pereira (born 22 January 1984) is a Brazilian football player. He also holds Portuguese citizenship.

Club career
He made his professional debut in the Campeonato Gaúcho for Brasil de Pelotas on 13 February 2009 in a game against Sapucaiense.

Personal
He is a cousin of Paulo Magalhães.

References

1984 births
Sportspeople from Rio Grande do Sul
Living people
Brazilian footballers
Sport Club Internacional players
Esporte Clube Bahia players
Vila Nova Futebol Clube players
Grêmio Esportivo Brasil players
Associação Chapecoense de Futebol players
Ferroviário Atlético Clube (CE) players
Santa Cruz Futebol Clube players
F.C. Penafiel players
Paulista Futebol Clube players
Académico de Viseu F.C. players
Lusitano FCV players
SC Mirandela players
Liga Portugal 2 players
Association football defenders